The Beni Immel is a tribe/clan in Kabylia, Algeria, located south-west of Béjaïa mainly in Timezrit.

Name 
The term "Beni" is an Arabic one, used in tribes to refer to their ancestors. For example, the tribe "Beni Abbas" meant sons of Abbas. "Beni Immel", was the most used term when referring to this tribe. In the native Kabyle language, the terms Aït, At or Ath were used instead of Beni. The Beni Immel called themselves "ⵜⵉⵎⴻⵣⵔⵉⵜ", or "Ath Yemmel". 

Because of these variations, the name of the Beni Immel was spelled in various ways throughout history. Examples include "Beni Immel", "Beni Yemmel", "Aït Yemmel", "At Yemmel", etc.

History 
The Beni Immel are located mainly in Timezrit District, which was historically part of their land. They mainly practiced agriculture and trade, and were noted to be relatively rich. They produced a wide variety of things, such as cereals, olive oil, fruits (especially grapes), honey, and they also practiced animal husbandry. They bordered the Soummam River around which they built watermills to produce flour. They were also known as warriors.

In the 6th century, the town of Icosium was briefly captured by some Berber-Numidian tribes, some of which were the ancestors of the Ath Immel.

The Beni Immel paid tribute/taxes to the Beylik of Constantine, although what the payment was, or how much of it was paid isn't known. As an isolated tribe inside the Kabyle mountains, other than paying tribute, they remained autonomous from the central government. According to French estimates, they possessed about 800 troops, the majority of whom were infantry.

Wars with France 
In the mid 19th century the Beni Immel came into conflict several time with France. 

In 1847, after the French took over Kabylia after defeating Ahmed bin Salem, the Beni Immel proceeded to rebel.

In 1850, French Brigadier general Joseph Napoléon Paul de Barral (no relation to Napoleon Bonparte) attempted to pacify the Beni Immel along with other local tribes, such as the Beni Iramel. In the ensuing battle, known as the Battle of Amsiouene, the Beni Iramel, and Beni Immel successfully killed Joseph Napoléon, and routed his unit.

In 1851 Sherif Boubaghla, a famous leader of local resistance was pursued by the French. He hid among the Beni Immel, and encouraged them to put up a resistance against the advancing French army. A few days later, when the French army arrived and demanded the Beni Immel to give Boubaghla over to them, they refused and put up a resistance. In the ensuing battle, which lasted for over 4 days, much longer than what the French army initially expected, the French secured the surrender of the Beni Immel tribe. The French were surprised at the "vigorous resistance" the Beni Immel put up.

References 

Kabyle people
Berbers in Algeria
Kabylie